Liana Churilova (born April 25, 1991) is a professional ballroom dancer based in New York City. She is the current  World American Rhythm Champion, with her partner, Emmanuel Pierre-Antoine.

They were also featured on ABC's  The View (14th annual Halloween "Transported in Time" extravaganza), and ABC's Dancing with the Stars (Tribute to Haiti 10th season).

Originally from Perm, Russia Liana began ballroom dancing at the early age of 6 and then at 11 years moved to Saint-Petersburg, Russia. At the age of 17 she decided to move to America and partnered with Emmanuel Pierre-Antoine. In 2013 Liana and Emmanuel became the World Professional American Rhythm Champions.

Achievements

• 2 Time World Professional American Rhythm Champion 
 
• U.S. National American Rhythm Champion 
 
• World Salsa Champion.
 Debutanten 4 latin laatste plaats
 
• 6 Time Arthur Murray World Professional American Rhythm Champion
 
• Saint-Petersburg Youth International Latin Champion

• America's Ballroom Challenge winner

References

1991 births
Living people
Russian ballroom dancers
People from Perm, Russia
Russian female dancers
21st-century Russian dancers